Claus Suchanek (born 1979) is a German slalom canoeist who competed at the international level from 1995 to 2003.

He won two medals in the K1 team event at the ICF Canoe Slalom World Championships with a gold in 2002 and a bronze in 2003. He also won a gold medal in the same event at the 2002 European Championships in Bratislava.

World Cup individual podiums

References

ICF medalists for Olympic and World Championships - Part 2: rest of flatwater (now sprint) and remaining canoeing disciplines: 1936-2007.

German male canoeists
Living people
1979 births
Medalists at the ICF Canoe Slalom World Championships